Magnesium benzoate is a chemical compound formed from magnesium and benzoic acid. It was once used to treat gout and arthritis.

References

Benzoates
Magnesium compounds